Arthur Collins may refer to:

Arts and entertainment
 Arthur Collins (singer) (1864–1933), American singer
 Arthur Collins (theatre manager) (1864–1932), manager of Drury Lane Theatre
 Arthur Greville Collins (1895–1980), American film director

Business and commerce
 Arthur A. Collins (1909–1987), founder of Collins Radio
 Arthur D. Collins Jr. (born 1947), chairman of Medtronic

Politics
 Arthur Collins (politician) (1832–1911), New Zealand politician
 Arthur R. Collins (born 1960), American political consultant

Sport
 A. E. J. Collins (1885–1914), English cricketer and soldier
 Art Collins (basketball) (born 1954), retired American basketball player
 Arthur Collins (cricketer) (1871–1945), English cricketer
 Arthur Collins (footballer, born 1882) (1882–1953), English football defender
 Arthur Collins (footballer, born 1902) (1902–1974), English football goalkeeper
 Arthur Collins (rugby union) (1906–1988), New Zealand rugby player
 Arthur W. Collins (1890–1970), American college football player and coach

Other
 Arthur Collins (antiquarian) (1682–1760), English genealogist and historian
 Arthur Collins (courtier) (1845–1911), English equerry in the courts of Queen Victoria and King Edward VII
 Arthur Collins (judge) (1834–1915), English colonial judge
 Arthur L. Collins (1868–1902), British metallurgist, mining engineer and mine manager
 Arthur S. Collins Jr. (1915–1984), United States Army general
 Arthur Collins (murder victim) (1937–1965), American man murdered in New York City

See also
 Collins (surname)